Li Datong (李大同, born 1952) was the Managing Editor of Freezing Point, a section of China Youth Daily. He now writes for openDemocracy, which is based in London.

Datong was openly critical of China's 2018 constitutional change that removed the term limits for the President. In an open letter to the National People's Congress he stated that the change would "sow the seeds of chaos".

See also 
 Media in the People's Republic of China

References

External links 
 Li Datong on China Digital Times
 Response to Freezing Point Closure
 Growing crackdown on Chinese media
 The Click that Broke a Government's Grip – the Washington Post on his protest against censorship

Living people
1952 births
Chinese activists
Chinese democracy activists